The 1936 Rose Bowl was the 22nd Rose Bowl game, an American post-season college football game that was played on New Year's Day 1936 in Pasadena, California. It featured the undefeated SMU Mustangs against the Stanford Indians, which had one loss. This was the first Rose Bowl to features two teams that were both located west of the Mississippi River, as the bowl game typically pitted the best teams from the eastern and western United States.

Background
Stanford had been to six previous Rose Bowls in a span of 34 years (and they would go to four more in the next 36 years), but they had only managed to win once while losing four times and tying once.

SMU had a perfect record of 12–0 and was ranked at the top with a defense that shut out their opponents 8 out of 12 games. This was their second ever bowl game but their first marquee bowl game.

Game summary
Not wanting to lose for the third consecutive time in the Rose Bowl, Stanford strove to score first, which they did with Bill Paulman's touchdown run in the first quarter. The rest of the game was a defensive struggle (which is why two ends were named MVP), highlighted by Stanford's six interceptions and SMU's crucial fumble at Stanford's five-yard line. In the end, there was 355 combined yards, but also 25 combined punts and only 15 first downs.

Scoring

First Quarter
Stan – Bill Paulman, 1-yard run (Moscrip kick good)

Game notes
The game was the first sellout for the Rose Bowl Game with all 84,784 seats filled with a large portion of fans from Texas to watch their Mustangs play. According to the Pasadena Tournament of Roses, there was a request for additional 200,000 tickets.

References

1935–36 NCAA football bowl games
1936
1936
1936
1936 in sports in California
January 1936 sports events